Chai Wan Road located in Hong Kong, is one of the major roads in Chai Wan on Hong Kong Island. It runs from Shau Kei Wan to Chai Wan through Chai Wan Gap; with one of the steepest inclines in Hong Kong on either side, with signs posted 1 in 10 gradient. It is therefore popularly referred to as Cheung Meng Che (長命斜), or long-lived incline.

The road was the only way towards Chai Wan before the opening of the Island Eastern Corridor and MTR Island line. Currently, it is still the only pedestrian route connecting to Chai Wan.

Route
From West to East:
Chai Wan Road starts from the connection with Shau Kei Wan Road and the off-ramp from the Island Eastern Corridor and then goes uphill through Chai Wan Gap. After junctioning with Tai Tam Road, it goes downhill into central Chai Wan, and intersects the Island Eastern Corridor's eastern terminus and Wan Tsui Road at a roundabout, before turning north-east and turning sharply to the east at the junction with Wing Tai Road and flows into Siu Sai Wan Road to the east at Sun Yip Street.

Accidents
On 19 November 2012, three men were killed and 56 people were injured when a New World First Bus's driver became unconscious and hit a Kowloon Motor Bus and a taxi. British citizen Ivan Aranto Herrera Jorge and Swede Carl Magnus Lindgren, members of celebrity chef Heston Blumenthal's culinary team, were among the dead.

On 20 January 2018, a truck whose crane was raised while driving on Chai Wan Road crashed into a bridge. No one was injured and the driver was stuck in the vehicle for an hour and half until being rescued.

Major buildings
From West to East:
Salesian English School
Island Garden
Shau Kei Wan Fire Station
Shau Kei Wan East Government Secondary School
Shau Kei Wan Government Secondary School
Shan Tsui Court
Hing Man Estate
Koway Court
Hing Wah Estate
Law Uk Folk Museum
Youth Square
New Jade Gardens
Chai Wan station
Wan Tsui Estate
Chai Wan Municipal Services Building
Lok Hin Terrace
Yue Wan Estate
Sheng Kung Hui Chai Wan St. Michael's Primary School
Mega iAdvantage (互聯優勢大廈) (One of the major Internet housing locations of Asia)

See also
List of streets and roads in Hong Kong

References

External links

Mega iAdvantage
Google Maps of Chai Wan Road

Chai Wan
Shau Kei Wan
Roads on Hong Kong Island